Purified may refer to:

Purified (rapper), Christian hip hop electrohop artist from South Africa, now in Sydney, Australia
Purified (album), 2005 gospel album by CeCe Winans
"Purified", single by Michael W. Smith from his album Worship
"Purified", a song by American metalcore band Of Mice & Men from their 2011 album The Flood

See also
Purified National Party, a break away from South African National Party which lasted from 1935 to 1948
Purify (disambiguation)
Purification (disambiguation)